Linden Boulevard is a boulevard in New York City. It starts off at Flatbush Avenue  in Brooklyn  as a one-way street to Caton Avenue, where it becomes a two-way boulevard, and stretches through both Brooklyn and Queens. This boulevard, especially the area of Cambria Heights between Springfield Boulevard and the Nassau County line represents a smaller version of shopping centers located on Jamaica Avenue and Queens Boulevard. Linden Boulevard also continues into Nassau County to Valley Stream where it turns into Central Avenue; this was one of several former names of the street in Queens.

Description
Linden Boulevard runs through both Brooklyn and Queens, but is interrupted by Aqueduct Racetrack and the street grid in Ozone Park, Queens. The street's character is very different in each borough.

In Brooklyn, between the intersection with Kings Highway and Remsen Avenue, and the intersection with 79th Street and South Conduit Avenue one block east of the Brooklyn–Queens border, it is one of the widest boulevards in the entire city, being a multi-median divided, 8-lane wide boulevard, similar to Queens' Woodhaven Boulevard and Queens Boulevard. While the speed limit on the rest of Linden Boulevard was set at 25 miles per hour in 2015, in line with the city speed limit, this section of Linden Boulevard was lowered over time. The speed limit was lowered to 30 MPH as part of the city's Vision Zero program in 2015, and was subsequently further lowered to 25 MPH in 2019. It is also one of Brooklyn's busiest streets, carrying many trucks, as it is the only direct route for commercial vehicles between Long Island and the Verrazzano-Narrows Bridge since commercial traffic is banned from the Belt Parkway, which runs between the same points. The stretch of Linden Boulevard from Caton Avenue to Conduit Avenue is part of New York State Route 27.

In Queens, it is mostly a simple two-lane, two-way residential street, no wider than the numbered avenues it parallels, and hardly busier until it reaches Cambria Heights, where it serves as a main commercial strip. Between Aqueduct Racetrack and Cross Bay Boulevard, there is a seven-block section of the boulevard that is mostly residential but is the only road between Rockaway Boulevard and Conduit Avenue on which traffic can flow east of the elevated railroad. One block west of Cross Bay Boulevard, contained within one block, are two short sections (each less than half a block), that are dead ends. One is off Desarc Road, and the other is located at the intersection of Sitka Street and Pitkin Avenue.

Conduit Avenue in Queens interrupts Linden Boulevard. The majority of its traffic merges into the Nassau Expressway, which starts just east of the Linden Boulevard/Conduit Avenue intersection. Linden Boulevard becomes a dead-end street at Pitkin Avenue; another dead-end stretch of the boulevard is at Desarc Road, one block east of Pitkin Avenue. Linden Boulevard then resumes at Cross Bay Boulevard one block east of the dead-end stretches, is interrupted by Aqueduct Racetrack, resumes at Rockaway Boulevard in South Ozone Park, and continues into Nassau County from there.

Transportation
In Brooklyn, the B20 bus runs on Linden Boulevard between Ashford Street and Elderts Lane in East New York. The B8 runs on Linden Boulevard between Rockaway and Church Avenues. In Queens, the Q4 bus line serves Linden Boulevard between Merrick Boulevard and the Nassau County border. The Q9 also serves a small stretch of Linden Boulevard in Richmond Hill.

In popular culture
Rappers Q-Tip and Phife Dawg, the founding members of the hip-hop group A Tribe Called Quest, both grew up on Linden Boulevard in the neighborhood of St. Albans, Queens in the 1970s and 80s. They later referred to Linden Boulevard in their songs "Check the Rhime" and "Jazz (We've Got)" (from the album The Low End Theory), "Steve Biko (Stir It Up)" (from Midnight Marauders) and "1nce Again", "Mind Power" and "Get A Hold" (from Beats, Rhymes and Life). The music video for "Check the Rhime" was mostly filmed on Linden Boulevard, and showed Q-Tip and Phife Dawg rapping above a crowd on the rooftop of a dry-cleaning store on Linden and 192nd Street. In July 2016, several months after Phife Dawg's death, a mural honoring A Tribe Called Quest was put up on the side of that dry cleaning store. In November 2016, the section of Linden Boulevard at the corner of 192nd St. was honorarily renamed to Malik 'Phife Dawg' Taylor Way.

The 1998 film Belly features Linden Boulevard.

Major intersections

References

External links

Streets in Brooklyn
Streets in Queens, New York